Liam van Gelderen (born 23 March 2001) is a Dutch footballer who plays as a defender for Groningen.

Club career
Van Gelderen made his Eredivisie debut for AFC Ajax on 23 April 2022 in a game against NEC Nijmegen as a 45th-minute substitute for Perr Schuurs.

On 17 June 2022, van Gelderen signed a two-year contract with Groningen.

International career
Born in the Netherlands, van Gelderen is of Surinamese descent. He is a youth international for the Netherlands.

Van Gelderen made his debut for the AFC Ajax senior team on

Career statistics

Club

Notes

Honours
Ajax
 Eredivisie: 2021–22

Netherlands U17
 UEFA European Under-17 Championship: 2018
Individual

 UEFA European Under-17 Championship Team of the Tournament: 2018

References

2001 births
Living people
Dutch footballers
Netherlands youth international footballers
Dutch sportspeople of Surinamese descent
Association football defenders
AZ Alkmaar players
AFC Ajax players
Jong Ajax players
FC Groningen players
Eerste Divisie players
Eredivisie players